Evans Blue is the third studio album by Canadian rock band Evans Blue. It is the first to feature singer Dan Chandler and the last to feature drummer Howard Davis.

Singles
The first single from the album is "Sick of It", which was made available on the band's Myspace page before its official release. "Bulletproof" and "Erase My Scars" were released as the second and third singles respectively. Erase My Scars peaked at #45 on the Rock Songs Chart and is Evans Blue's first charting single since "The Pursuit" in 2007. The final single, "Say It", was released on February 1, 2011.

Track listing

Personnel
Evans Blue
Dan Chandler - vocals
Parker Lauzon - rhythm guitar
Vlad Tanaskovic - lead guitar
Joe Pitter - bass
Howard Davis - drums

Production
Produced by Trevor Kustiak
Mixed by Mark Makoway
Executive producer - Mark Dew
Engineered by Dennis Tougas, Jeff Pelletier and Lucas Johnson
Mastered by Robert Vosgien at Capitol Studios, Los Angeles
Recorded at Phase One-The Pocket-GBP-The Garage Studios

Additional musicians
Kevin Fox - cellos on "A Step Back"

References

2009 albums
Evans Blue albums